Enoch Foster (May 10, 1839 – November 15, 1913) was a justice of the Supreme Judicial Court of Maine.

Biography

Enoch Foster was born in Newry, Maine on May 10, 1839 and was of Puritan Yankee ancestry. He attended Bates College (then called the Maine State Seminary), graduating in 1860. He went on to enroll in Bowdoin in 1860 and graduated from Bowdoin College in 1864 after receiving credit for time he spent in the 13th Regiment of the Maine Volunteer Infantry during the American Civil War, with his second degree.  Foster studied law at Albany Law School and passed the bar exam in New York and Maine.  Governor Robie appointed Foster to the Maine Supreme Judicial Court in 1884.  After stepping down from the Supreme Court, Foster co-founded the firm of Foster and Hersey and remained active in the Republican Party, the Freemasons, Grand Army of the Republic and Odd Fellows. Enoch Foster died in Portland, Maine on November 15, 1913, and was buried at Evergreen Cemetery.

He married Adeline Lowe in 1864 and Sarah Chapman in 1873 after Lowe's death in 1872. He and Chapman had one son.

References

1839 births
1913 deaths
Bates College alumni
Albany Law School alumni
Justices of the Maine Supreme Judicial Court
People from Oxford County, Maine
Burials at Evergreen Cemetery (Portland, Maine)
Maine Republicans
People of Maine in the American Civil War
19th-century American judges